The Green and the Gray is a 2004 novel by American writer Timothy Zahn.

Plot introduction
A young couple, still sorting out life together, are given custody of a girl at gunpoint.  As they grow in their desire to help and protect the girl, they find themselves in an increasingly complex and dangerous situation.

Thematic elements
The novel features two thematic elements which are common in science fiction. One is the conflict between machine technology and biological science. The other is the idea that there is a secret war between two factions which is being fought on Earth, with most people completely unaware of it.

Novels by Timothy Zahn
2004 American novels